Lalande is a small lunar impact crater that lies in the central part of the visible Moon, on the eastern edge of Mare Insularum. It was named after French astronomer Jérôme Lalande. The crater is surrounded by a high-albedo area of ejecta that extends into a ray system with a maximum radius of over 300 kilometers. The interior wall has a terrace system, and there is a small central rise at the midpoint of the floor. It was formed during the Copernican period of the moon extending from 1.1 billion years ago to the present. Its young age is indicated by the bright rays of ejecta surrounding the crater, its sharp features, and the relative lack of later impacts in its interior. The rays of ejecta from Lalande overlay the ejecta rays from Copernicus Crater, meaning it is younger than Copernicus, and thus no more than 800 million years old.

In 2002, a meteorite was discovered in the Oman desert by Edwin Gnos of the University of Berne. This rock, identified as Sayh al Uhaymir 169, is believed to have originated from the Moon. It was ejected from the surface during an impact that occurred less than 340,000 years in the past. Scientists now think that the rock originated from the crater ejecta blanket surrounding Lalande.

Satellite craters
By convention these features are identified on lunar maps by placing the letter on the side of the crater midpoint that is closest to Lalande.

References

External links

 Rock traced from moon crater to Earth — CNN article from July 30, 2004 (accessed 10/06/05.)
 
Lalande at The Moon Wiki

Impact craters on the Moon